Igal Hecht is a documentary filmmaker. In 1999 he founded Chutzpa Productions, a production company.

References

External links 

Canadian documentary film directors
Canadian documentary film producers
Jewish Canadian filmmakers
Living people
Year of birth missing (living people)